The women's 10K (10 kilometer) race at the 2009 World Championships occurred on Wednesday, 22 July at Ostia Beach in Rome, Italian. In total, 45 women from 26 countries competed in the race.

Results

Key: DNF = Did not finish

See also
Open water swimming at the 2007 World Aquatics Championships – Women's 10 km
Swimming at the 2008 Summer Olympics

References

2009 Worlds results: Women's 10K from OmegaTiming.com (official timer of the 2009 Worlds); retrieved 2009-07-22.

World Aquatics Championships
Open water swimming at the 2009 World Aquatics Championships
2009 in women's swimming